KVNR (1480 kHz) is a commercial AM radio station licensed to Santa Ana, California, and serving Orange and Los Angeles counties. It is owned by Estrella Media, and broadcasts a Vietnamese language format known as "Little Saigon Radio".  Programming is also broadcast in San Jose (KSJX) and simulcasted on DirecTV channel 2039.

KVNR airs Vietnamese talk shows, newscasts, variety shows, and popular music. The station also rebroadcasts the Vietnamese services of Radio France Internationale and Radio Free Asia.  This station directly competes with KALI-FM 106.3 MHz, which also airs Vietnamese-language programming in the Los Angeles metropolitan area.

History
KVNR was first licensed, as KWTC, in October 1926 to Dr. John W. Hancock, and signed on the air on December 10, 1926. In the 1980s and 90s, the station was KWIZ, which aired a full service adult contemporary format.  In 1947, it added an FM counterpart, KVOE-FM, at 96.7 MHz.

References

External links

VNR
VNR
Estrella Media stations
Radio stations established in 1926
1926 establishments in California